GalliumOS is a Linux distribution for ChromeOS devices, developed by the community-supported GalliumOS project. The distribution is made for Chrome hardware including Chromebook, Chromebox, Chromebit and Chromebase. GalliumOS beta1 was released on 10 November 2015.

Features
GalliumOS is based on Xubuntu and maintains compatibility with the Ubuntu repositories. Multiple sources indicate that Galliums' boot time is faster than other Linux distributions made for ChromeOS. It is optimized to limit stalls and has integrated touchpad drivers.

GalliumOS is compatible with some ChromeOS devices. It is necessary to prepare the device in different ways based on the hardware chipset.

As of 2022, the GalliumOS project has been discontinued. Their wiki advises existing GalliumOS users to migrate to another Linux OS due to security hazards.

Prerequisites

Some Chromebooks require a third-party firmware update before they can boot other operating systems, including GalliumOS. Chromebook firmware can be updated after disabling hardware write-protect, a process that varies by model. A firmware installer script is available for most models, written by MrChromebox.

References

External links
Official website 
GalliumOS wiki 
MrChromebox firmware 

Ubuntu  derivatives
Linux distributions